The Whitefish Point Underwater Preserve was established in 1987 to protect and conserve shipwrecks and historical resources on  of Lake Superior bottomlands in Whitefish Bay and around Whitefish Point, Michigan.  The formation of the Michigan Underwater Preserves helped stop controversy over artifact removal from shipwrecks of this area.  The preserve is now known for deep, well preserved shipwrecks in clear water accessible to scuba divers with technical skill and experience.  The preserve is one of the last places in the Great Lakes to observe shipwrecks without zebra mussel encrustation.

History
Shipwrecks along the southern Lake Superior coast known as the "Graveyard of the Great Lakes" dramatically increased after the first lock on the St. Marys River opened this coastline to shipping in 1855. Every vessel entering or leaving Lake Superior must pass Whitefish Point. The Whitefish Point Light first established in 1849 is arguably the most important light on Lake Superior. More vessels have been lost in the Whitefish Point area than any other part of Lake Superior. Between the loss of the Invincible in 1816 and the sinking of the SS Edmund Fitzgerald in 1975, the Whitefish Point area has claimed at least 240 ships. Vessels are funneled through Whitefish Bay downbound and upbound from the Soo Locks. Poor visibility from forest fire smoke, snow squalls, and Lake Superior's notorious fogs had deadly consequences with the traffic congestion. Such a storm sank the SS Edmund Fitzgerald  from Whitefish Point in 1975.

Sport diver Harrington reported that many of the shipwrecks of the Whitefish Point Underwater Preserve were "stripped of important artifacts in the 1970s and early 1980s. The State of Michigan filed a lawsuit against the Great Lakes Shipwreck Historical Society (GLSHS) for illegal removal of artifacts from Great Lakes bottomlands. The Michigan Department of Natural Resources (DNR) obtained a search warrant in 1992 and raided on the GLSHS's offices and  Great Lakes Shipwreck Museum.  The DNR found evidence the Shipwreck Society had:

Many of the artifacts removed from shipwrecks by the GLSHS without permits are displayed at the Great Lakes Shipwreck Museum at Whitefish Point by a settlement agreement with the state of Michigan. The sport diving community raised a furious outcry over the disparity of special treatment for the museum divers who received no criminal prosecution while individual sport divers were prosecuted freely during the late 1980s and 1990s for removal of artifacts from shipwrecks.  To this day many sport divers boycott the Great Lakes Shipwreck Museum.

Preserve formation

The Whitefish Point Underwater Preserve was established in 1987 to protect some of the region's most sensitive underwater natural and cultural resources with the central objective to provide enhanced management of shipwrecks. The Whitefish Point Underwater Preserve is administered through the Michigan Department of Environmental Quality Submerged Lands Program and the Michigan Department of History, Arts and Libraries of the Michigan Historical Center.

Scuba divers and history enthusiasts now help ensure the integrity of the preserve which is considered an underwater museum.

Features 

The preserve has good visibility and offers deep water diving on a variety of shipwrecks.  The preserve is one of the last places in the Great Lakes to observe shipwrecks without zebra mussel encrustation. Dry suits are recommended due to cold temperatures and unprotected coves or bays.  Most of the dive sites are deep and divers must be certain of their ability and their equipment before they attempt to dive in this preserve.

See also 

 Michigan Underwater Preserves

References

External links 
 Michigan Underwater Preserve Council – Whitefish Point
 Whitefish Point Underwater Preserve
 DEQ – Whitefish Point Underwater Preserve
 Michigan Shipwreck Site

Archaeology of shipwrecks
Wreck diving sites
Shipwrecks of Lake Superior
Marine parks of Michigan
Protected areas of Luce County, Michigan
Protected areas of Chippewa County, Michigan
Underwater archaeological sites
Archaeological sites in Michigan
Underwater diving sites in the United States
1987 establishments in Michigan
Protected areas established in 1987